Troglomethes is a genus of false soldier beetles in the family Omethidae. There are at least two described species in Troglomethes.

Species
These two species belong to the genus Troglomethes:
 Troglomethes leechi Wittmer, 1970
 Troglomethes oregonensis Wittmer, 1970

References

Further reading

 
 

Elateroidea
Articles created by Qbugbot